The name Catuaba (via Portuguese from Guarani) is used for the infusions of the bark of a number of trees native to Brazil. The most widely used barks are derived from the trees Trichilia catigua and Erythroxylum vaccinifolium. Other catuaba preparations use the bark of trees from the following genera or families: Anemopaegma, Ilex, Micropholis, Phyllanthus, Secondatia, Tetragastris and species from the Myrtaceae.

It is often claimed that catuaba is derived from the tree Erythroxylum catuaba, but this tree has been described only once, in 1904, and it is not known today to what tree this name referred. E. catuaba is therefore not a recognised species (Kletter et al.; 2004).

Local synonyms are Chuchuhuasha, Tatuaba, Pau de Reposta, Piratancara and Caramuru. A commercial liquid preparation, Catuama, contains multiple ingredients, one of these being catuaba from Trichilia catigua.

An infusion of the bark is used in traditional Brazilian medicine as an aphrodisiac and central nervous system stimulant. These claims have not been confirmed in scientific studies. In catuaba is found a group of three alkaloids dubbed catuabine A, B and C.

A study by Manabe et al. (1992) showed that catuaba extracts from Catuaba casca (Erythroxylum catuaba Arr. Cam.) were useful in preventing potentially lethal bacterial infections and HIV infection in mice.

Notes

References

 

   Reprint published in 3 parts in Brazilian Journal of Pharmacognosy, as cited below as da Silva, A. J. (2004, 2005)

 

 

Catuaba is a medicinal plant found in Brazil in the Amazon region that contains an incredible abundance of plant life – more than half of the planet's vegetation.

The most famous of all Brazilian aphrodisiac plants and is the result of the blend of four main medicinal herbs from the Brazilian Amazon:

Catuaba (Trichilla catigua) (28.23%)
Ginger (Zingiber officinale) (3.26%)
Guarana (Paullinia cupana) (40.31%) and
Muirapuama (Ptychopetalum olacoides) (28.23%)

Cautuba Aphrodisiac: How To Use, Benefits and Contraindications!

Herbal and fungal stimulants
Traditional Brazilian medicine
Plant common names

fr:Catuaba